Daniel Aguilar Muñoz (born 6 February 1998) is a Mexican professional footballer who plays as a defensive midfielder for Liga MX club Puebla.

Career statistics

Club

References

External links
 
 
 
 Daniel Aguilar at WhoScored

Living people
1998 births
Atlas F.C. footballers
Mexican footballers
Liga MX players
Association football midfielders
Footballers from Guadalajara, Jalisco